The Fountain of the Mermaid of Lleida is a fountain located in the Parc des Champs Elysees in  Lleida, Catalonia, Spain. It features a mermaid holding in a hand a conch, which released the water. The fountain is surrounded by a garden. 

It once took the form of a nymph, which was replaced by a mermaid in 1982, due to the deterioration of the original statue. This is the most famous monument in the park, and the second most visited site in the city, behind the cathedral La Seu Vella.

Buildings and structures in Lleida
Mermaid Lleida